Lumdung village located in Pakke-Kessang district, Arunachal Pradesh in India. It is inhabited by Nyishi (Bagni) people.

References

Villages in Pakke-Kessang district